Oxygen: Custom Concert is a 2004 concert featuring Ashanti performing her singles including "Only U", "Happy", and  "Foolish". She had guest appearances by Ja Rule and Irv Gotti. The show also involved Kenny Chesney who, like Ashanti, performed some of his biggest hits and performed a duet with Ashanti.

Concert films